Rivelli or di Rivello is an ancient Italian surname. Notable people with the surname include:

Galeazzo Rivelli, Italian painter
Luisa Rivelli, (born Rossella Lanfranchi, 1930), Italian actress
Naike Rivelli, (born 1974), Italian actress and singer
Ornella Muti, (born Francesca Romana Rivelli; 9 March 1955)

Italian-language surnames